Aurora Expeditions is an Australian company that runs cruises, expeditions and tours.

History 
The company was founded in 1991 by Greg and Margaret Mortimer. It focuses on small groups of travelers. The company's main focus is cruises around Antarctica and the sun-Antarctic Islands. As well as cruising, the company also does Alpine Trekking and climbing, Ski and Snowboard tours, Snorkelling and Scuba Diving.

In 1992 the company performed its first expedition to Antarctica.

In 1997 the company performed its first expedition to the Arctic.

In 2019 took delivery of its first ship, the Greg Mortimer. It was christened at a ceremony in Ushuaia, Argentina.

In 2022 the company's second ship, the Sylvia Earle, departed on its inaugural cruise from Ushuaia, Argentina.

Coronavirus Pandemic 
In April 2020, the Greg Mortimer had an outbreak of COVID-19 on board, leading to it to be denied permission to dock in many South American ports. 128 passengers and crew on board eventually tested positive. The ship was eventually given permission to dock in Uruguay, from where passengers were evacuated or admitted to hospital. Many crew-members ended up being evacuated too, with more than half testing positive for the virus.

Fleet 
As of January 2020, Aurora Expeditions had two vessels in its fleet:

References 

Australian companies established in 1991
Cruise lines